The Serravallian is, in the geologic timescale, an age or a stage in the middle Miocene Epoch/Series, which spans the time between 13.82 Ma and 11.63 Ma (million years ago). The Serravallian follows the Langhian and is followed by the Tortonian.

It overlaps with the middle of the Astaracian European Land Mammal Mega Zone, the upper Barstovian and lower Clarendonian North American Land Mammal Ages and the Laventan and lower Mayoan South American Land Mammal Ages. It is also coeval with the Sarmatian and upper Badenian Stages of the Paratethys time scale of Central and eastern Europe.

Definition
The Serravallian Stage was introduced in stratigraphy by the Italian geologist Lorenzo Pareto in 1865. It was named after the town of Serravalle Scrivia in northern Italy.

The base of the Serravallian is at the first occurrence of fossils of the nanoplankton species Sphenolithus heteromorphus and is located in the chronozone C5ABr. The official Global Boundary Stratotype Section and Point (GSSP) for the Serravallian is in the 'Ras il-Pellegrin' section, located at the 'Ras il-Pellegrin' headland in the vicinity of 'Fomm ir-Rih' Bay, SW Malta.The base of the Serravallian is represented in the field as the formation boundary between the Globigerina Limestone formation and the Blue Clay formation. The base of the Serravallian is related to the Mi3b oxygen isotope excursion marking the onset of the Middle Miocene Cooling step.

The top of the Serravallian (the base of the Tortonian Stage) is at the last common appearance of calcareous nanoplanktons Discoaster kugleri and planktonic foram Globigerinoides subquadratus. It is also associated with the short normal-polarized chronozone C5r.2n.

Paleontology

Cartilaginous fish
Lamniformes
Otodontidae: †Otodus

Birds

Anseriformes
Anatidae: Clangula sp.

Mammals
Primates
Hominidae: †Anoiapithecus

Reptiles
Squamata
Agamidae: Pogona and Diporiphora diverged from their last common ancestor during the Serravallian. 
Crocodylomorpha
The last known sebecid, Barinasuchus, goes extinct about 11.8 mya. Thus ending the lineage of the notosuchians.

References

Notes

Literature

; 2004: A Geologic Time Scale 2004, Cambridge University Press.
; 1865: Note sur la subdivision que l'on pourrait etablir dans les terrains de l'Apennin septentrional, Bulletin de la Société Géologique de France 2(22), p. 210-277.

External links
GeoWhen Database - Serravallian
Neogene timescale, at the website of the subcommission for stratigraphic information of the ICS
 Neogene timescale at the website of the Norwegian network of offshore records of geology and stratigraphy

 
04
 
Miocene geochronology
Geological ages